Min jul is a Christmas album by Jan Johansen, released on 6 November 2013.

Track listing 
Vit jul - (Jörgen Smedshammar)
Driving Home for Christmas - (Chris Rea)
Jul, jul, strålande jul - Gustav Nordqvist, Edvard Evers
Var inte rädd - Lars Moberg, Ylva Eggehorn
I'll Be Home for Christmas - (Walter Kent, Kim Gannon, Buck Ram)
Christmas Song - (Mel Tormé, Bob Wells)
Sista andetaget - (Thomas Thörnholm, Danne Attlerud)
Se på mig - (Bobby Ljunggren, Håkan Almgren, Ingela Forsman)
Sista söndagen i advent (Jörgen Smedshammar, David Nyström)
Blue Christmas - (Bil Hayes, Jay W. Johnson)
Have Yourself a Merry Little Christmas - (Ralph Blane, Hugh Martin)
Ave Maria - (Charles Gounod, Ture Rangström)

Contributors 
Jan Johansen - vocals, guitar
Peter Ljung - piano, keyboard
Britt Louise Håkansson, Nils Flink, Ulrika Bernövall, Mari Gustavsson, Arne Rhodin, Lars Renklint - (conductors)
Sankt Nicolai sångensemble, Centrumkyrkan's choir, Ramsberg church choir, Diocese of Berga choirs, Askersunds traddjazz choir, Villberg choir

References 

Jan Johansen (singer) albums
2013 Christmas albums
Christmas albums by Swedish artists
Schlager Christmas albums